Day After Tomorrow is the first studio album by Japanese J-pop band Day After Tomorrow.

Track listing

Personnel 

 Misono Kōda – vocals
 Masato Kitano – guitar
 Daisuke Suzuki – keyboard

2002 debut albums
Day After Tomorrow (band) albums
Avex Group albums